Shek Pai is an at-grade MTR  stop located at the junction of Shek Pai Tau Road and Ming Kum Road in Tuen Mun District. It began service on 18 September 1988 and belongs to Zone 2.

References

MTR Light Rail stops
Former Kowloon–Canton Railway stations
Tuen Mun District
Railway stations in Hong Kong opened in 1988